The 2022 World Taekwondo Championships was the 25th edition of the World Taekwondo Championships and was held at the Centro Acuático CODE Metropolitano, in Guadalajara, Mexico from 13 to 20 November 2022. It was at first scheduled to be held in Wuxi, China in 2021, but withdrawn due to the impact of the global COVID-19 pandemic. In January 2022, the event was first moved to Cancún, Mexico. This was the second time after 2013, that Mexico has held the event.

Medal table

Medal summary

Men

Women

Team ranking

Men

Women

References

2022 World Taekwondo Championships
World Taekwondo Championships
World Championships
International taekwondo competitions hosted by Mexico
World Taekwondo Championships
Sport in Guadalajara, Jalisco
Taekwondo in Mexico
World Taekwondo Championships